The Paris Organising Committee for the 2024 Olympic and Paralympic Games (COJOP2024) is the organising committee for the 2024 Summer Olympics and the 2024 Summer Paralympics which are scheduled to be held in Paris, France. Tony Estanguet serves as president of the committee. Étienne Thobois serves as director general. The committee was established on 18 January 2018.

The committee has an agreement with the TOCOG2020 of the 2020 Summer Olympics and Paralympics to share knowledge and expertise. The committee also has an agreement with the organising committee of the 2026 Winter Olympics and Paralympics to share knowledge and resources as well as joint communication and advocacy.

Board of directors

The board of directors consists of the following members and it includes representatives of several public bodies and society.

 Tony Estanguet, president
 Bernard Lapasset, honorary president
 Guy Drut and Jean-Christophe Rolland, members of the International Olympic Committee (IOC)
 Brigitte Henriques, president of French National Olympic and Sports Committee (Comité national olympique et sportif français, CNOSF)
 Didier Seminet, secretary general of the CNOSF
 Gwladys Épangue and Fabien Gilot, co-presidents of the High Level Athletes' Commission (Commission des athlètes de haut-niveau, CAHN)
 Evelyne Ciriegi, president of the Greater Paris Regional Olympic and Sports Committee (Comité Régional Olympique et Sportif Ile-de-France, CROSIF)
 Marie-Amélie Le Fur, president of the French Paralympic and Sports Committee (Comité Paralympique et Sportif Français, CPSF)
 Guislaine Westelynck, president of the French Handisport Federation (Fédération Française Handisport, FFH)
 Cyril Moré, representative of Paralympic athletes
 Tanguy de La Forest, secretary general of the French Paralympic and Sports Committee
 Valérie Barlois-Mevel-Leroux, president of the French Olympians Association
 Guy Forget, athlete selected by the organising committee
 Martin Fourcade, athlete selected by the organising committee
 Nantenin Keita, athlete selected by the organising committee
 Sarah Ourahmoune, athlete selected by the organising committee

Representatives of public bodies:

 Anne Hidalgo, mayor of France, representative of Council of Paris
 Emmanuel Grégoire, deputy mayor of France, representative of Council of Paris
 Pierre Rabadan, deputy for sports, representative of Council of Paris
 Valérie Pécresse, president of Regional Council of Île-de-France, representative of the Greater Paris region
 Patrick Karam, vice-president of the Regional Council of Île-de-France
 Vincent Roger, Special Envoy of the Regional Council of Île-de-France to the Olympic and Paralympic Games
 Roxana Mărăcineanu, Minister Delegate for Sport, attached to the Minister of National Education, Youth and Sport, government representative
 Sophie Cluzel, Secretary of State for People with Disabilities, government representative
 Olivier Dussopt, Minister Delegate for Public Accounts, attached to the Minister of the Economy, Finance and the Recovery, government representative
 Stéphane Troussel, president of Departmental Council of Seine-Saint-Denis
 Mathieu Hanotin, departmental advisor, representative of Departmental Council of Seine-Saint-Denis, also president of the Plaine Commune combined authority
 Patrick Ollier, president of Greater Paris
 Quentin Gesell, mayor of Dugny, representative of Greater Paris area
 Benoît Payan, mayor of Marseille, representative of authorities beyond the Greater Paris area
 Michel Cadot, Interministerial Delegate for the 2024 Olympic and Paralympic Games
 Nicolas Ferrand, CEO of SOLIDEO
 Jean-Baptiste Borsali, mayor of Le Bourget, representative of Terres d'Envol combined authority

Representatives of society:

 Bernard Thibault, member of governing board of the International Labour Organization
 Geoffroy Roux de Bézieux, chair of Movement of the Enterprises of France (Mouvement des Entreprises de France, MEDEF)
 Alexandre Mars, president/founder of the Epic Foundation
 Alain Rochon, president of APF France handicap
 Michel Cymes, doctor and surgeon
 Stéphanie Goujon, CEO of Agence du Don en Nature
 Ryadh Sallem, Paralympian, founder of CAPSAAA foundation (Cap sport art aventure amitié Paris)

Athletes’ Commission

The Athletes’ Commission is focused on the experience of the athletes competing at the 2024 Olympics and Paralympics and the commission consists of following 18 members:

 Martin Fourcade, Olympic biathlete and president of the commission
 Julien Benneteau, Olympic tennis player
 Marie Bochet, Paralympic alpine skier
 Perle Bouge, Paralympic rower
 Lucas Créange, Paralympic table tennis player
 Théo Curin, Paralympic swimmer
 Hélène Defrance, Olympic sailor
 Stéphane Diagana, Olympic athlete
 Gévrise Émane, Olympic judoka
 Gwladys Épangue, Olympic taekwondo practitioner
 Guillaume Gille, Olympic handball player
 Fabien Gilot, Olympic swimmer
 Astrid Guyart, Olympic fencer
 Jessica Harrison, Olympic triathlete
 Fanny Horta, Olympic rugby union player
 Michaël Jérémiasz, Paralympic wheelchair tennis player
 Florian Rousseau, Olympic track cyclist
 Diandra Tchatchouang, Olympic basketball player (she joined after Marine Johannès left the commission in April 2019)

See also
2024 Summer Olympics
2024 Summer Paralympics

References

External links
Official website

2024 Summer Olympics
2024 Summer Paralympics